The Scheduled Castes (SCs) and Scheduled Indian Tribes (SITs) are officially designated groups of people and among the most disadvantaged socio-economic groups in India. The terms are recognized in the Constitution of India and the groups are designated in one or other of the categories. For much of the period of British rule in the Indian subcontinent, they were known as the Depressed Classes.

In modern literature, the Scheduled Castes are sometimes referred to as Dalit, meaning "broken" or "dispersed", the term having been popularised by B. R. Ambedkar (1891–1956), a Dalit himself, an economist, reformer, chairman of the Constituent Assembly of India, and Dalit leader during the independence struggle. Ambedkar preferred the term Dalit to Gandhi's term, Harijan, meaning "person of Hari/Vishnu" (or Man of God). In September 2018, the government "issued an advisory to all private satellite channels asking them to 'refrain' from using the nomenclature 'Dalit'", though "rights groups and intellectuals have come out against any shift from 'Dalit' in popular usage".

The Scheduled Castes and Scheduled Tribes comprise about 16.6% and 8.6%, respectively, of India's population (according to the 2011 census). The Constitution (Scheduled Castes) Order, 1950 lists 1,108 castes across 28 states in its First Schedule, and the Constitution (Scheduled Tribes) Order, 1950 lists 744 tribes across 22 states in its First Schedule.

Since the independence of India, the Scheduled Castes and Scheduled Tribes were given Reservation status, guaranteeing political representation, preference in promotion, quota in universities, free and stipended education, scholarships, banking services, various government schemes and the Constitution lays down the general principles of positive discrimination for SCs and STs.

Definition

 Scheduled Tribes
As per Article 366 (25) of Constitution of India the Scheduled Tribe is defined as;
 “Such tribes or tribal communities or part of or groups within such tribes or tribal communities as are deemed under Article 342 to the Scheduled Tribes (STs) for the purposes of this [Indian] Constitution”

History
The evolution of Lower caste to modern-day Scheduled Castes is complex. The caste system as a stratification of classes in India originated about 2,000 years ago, and has been influenced by dynasties and ruling elites, including the Mughal Empire and the British Raj. The Hindu concept of Varna historically incorporated occupation-based communities. Some low-caste groups, such as those formerly called untouchables who constitute modern-day Scheduled Castes, were considered outside the Varna system.

Since the 1850s, these communities were loosely referred to as Depressed Classes, with the Scheduled Castes and Scheduled Tribes.The early 20th century saw a flurry of activity in the British authorities assessing the feasibility of responsible self-government for India. The Morley–Minto Reforms Report, Montagu–Chelmsford Reforms Report and the Simon Commission were several initiatives in this context. A highly contested issue in the proposed reforms was the reservation of seats for representation of the Depressed Classes in provincial and central legislatures.

In 1935, the UK Parliament passed the Government of India Act 1935, designed to give Indian provinces greater self-rule and set up a national federal structure. The reservation of seats for the Depressed Classes was incorporated into the act, which came into force in 1937. The Act introduced the term "Scheduled Castes", defining the group as "such castes, parts of groups within castes, which appear to His Majesty in Council to correspond to the classes of persons formerly known as the 'Depressed Classes', as His Majesty in Council may prefer". This discretionary definition was clarified in The Government of India (Scheduled Castes) Order, 1936, which contained a list (or Schedule) of castes throughout the British-administered provinces.

After independence the Constituent Assembly continued the prevailing definition of Scheduled Castes and Tribes, giving (via articles 341 and 342) the president of India and governors of the states a mandate to compile a full listing of castes and tribes (with the power to edit it later, as required). The complete list of castes and tribes was made via two orders: The Constitution (Scheduled Castes) Order, 1950 and The Constitution (Scheduled Tribes) Order, 1950, respectively. Furthermore, independent India's quest for inclusivity was incident through the appointment of B. R. Ambedkar as the chair of the drafting committee for the Constitution. Ambedkar was a scheduled caste constitutional lawyer, a member of the low caste.

Government initiative to improve the situation of SCs and STs
The Constitution provides a three-pronged strategy to improve the situation of SCs and STs:
Protective arrangements: Such measures as are required to enforce equality, to provide punitive measures for transgressions, and to eliminate established practices that perpetuate inequities. A number of laws were enacted to implement the provisions in the Constitution. Examples of such laws include the Untouchability Practices Act, 1955, Scheduled Caste and Scheduled Tribe (Prevention of Atrocities) Act, 1989, The Employment of Manual Scavengers and Construction of Dry Latrines (Prohibition) Act, 1993, etc. Despite legislation, social discrimination and atrocities against the backward castes continued to persist.
Affirmative action: Provide positive treatment in allotment of jobs and access to higher education as a means to accelerate the integration of the SCs and STs with mainstream society. Affirmative action is popularly known as reservation. Article 16 of the Constitution states "nothing in this article shall prevent the State from making any provisions for the reservation of appointments or posts in favor of any backward class of citizens, which, in the opinion of the state, is not adequately represented in the services under the State". The Supreme Court upheld the legality of affirmative action and the Mandal Commission (a report that recommended that affirmative action not only apply to the Untouchables, but the other backward castes as well). However, the reservations from affirmative action were only allotted in the public sector, not the private.
Development: Provide resources and benefits to bridge the socioeconomic gap between the SCs and STs and other communities. Legislation to improve the socioeconomic situation of SCs and STs because twenty-seven percent of SC and thirty-seven percent of ST households lived below the poverty line, compared to the mere eleven percent among other households. Additionally, the backward castes were poorer than other groups in Indian society, and they suffered from higher morbidity and mortality rates.

National commissions
To effectively implement the safeguards built into the Constitution and other legislation, the Constitution under Articles 338 and 338A provides for two constitutional commissions: the National Commission for Scheduled Castes, and the National Commission for Scheduled Tribes. The chairpersons of both commissions sit ex officio on the National Human Rights Commission.Scheduled Castes in India.

Constitutional history
In the original Constitution, Article 338 provided for a special officer (the Commissioner for SCs and STs) responsible for monitoring the implementation of constitutional and legislative safeguards for SCs and STs and reporting to the president. Seventeen regional offices of the Commissioner were established throughout the country.

There was an initiative to replace the Commissioner with a committee in the 48th Amendment to the Constitution, changing Article 338. While the amendment was being debated, the Ministry of Welfare established the first committee for SCs and STs (with the functions of the Commissioner) in August 1978. These functions were modified in September 1987 to include advising the government on broad policy issues and the development levels of SCs and STs. Now it is included in Article 342.

In 1990, Article 338 was amended for the National Commission for SCs and STs with the Constitution (Sixty fifth Amendment) Bill, 1990. The first commission under the 65th Amendment was constituted in March 1992, replacing the Commissioner for Scheduled Castes and Scheduled Tribes and the commission established by the Ministry of Welfare's Resolution of 1989. In 2003, the Constitution was again amended to divide the National Commission for Scheduled Castes and Scheduled Tribes into two commissions: the National Commission for Scheduled Castes and the National Commission for Scheduled Tribes. Due to the spread of Christianity and Islam among schedule caste community converted are not protected as castes under Indian Reservation policy. Hence, these societies usually forge their community certificate as Hindus and practice Christianity or Islam afraid for their loss of reservation.

Scheduled Castes Sub-Plan
The Scheduled Castes Sub-Plan (SCSP) of 1979 mandated a planning process for the social, economic and educational development of Scheduled Castes and improvement in their working and living conditions. It was an umbrella strategy, ensuring the flow of targeted financial and physical benefits from the general sector of development to the Scheduled Castes. It entailed a targeted flow of funds and associated benefits from the annual plan of states and Union Territories (UTs) in at least a proportion to the national SC population. Twenty-seven states and UTs with sizable SC populations are implementing the plan. Although the Scheduled Castes population according to the 2001 Census was 16.66 crores (16.23% of the total population), the allocations made through SCSP have been lower than the proportional population. A strange factor has emerged of extremely lowered fertility of scheduled castes in Kerala, due to land reform, migrating (Kerala Gulf diaspora) and democratization of education.

Demographics

Scheduled Caste Population by State

Scheduled Tribe Population by State

See also

 Forward caste
 Inter-caste marriages in India
 List of Scheduled Tribes in India
 Other Backward Classes
 Socio Economic Caste Census 2011

References

Further reading

External links
 Ministry of Tribal Affairs
 2001 Census of India – Tables on Individual Scheduled Castes and Scheduled Tribes
 Dalit Indian Chamber of Commerce & Industry
 Administrative Atlas of India – 2011

 
Caste system in India
 
Adivasi